The women's jianshu / qiangshu all-around competition at the 2008 Beijing Wushu Tournament was held from August 21 to 22 at the Olympic Sports Center Gymnasium.

Schedule 
All times are Beijing Time (UTC+08:00)

Results 
Both events were judged without the degree of difficulty component.

References 

Women's_jianshu_and_qiangshu